Stone industry refers to the part of the primary sector of the economy, similar to the mining industry, but concerned with excavations of stones, in particular granite, marble, slate and sandstone. Other products of the industry include crushed stone and dimension stone.

Stone industry is one of the oldest in the world. Creation of stone tools (microliths industry) in the region of South Africa has been dated to about 60,000–70,000 years ago. Granite and marble mining existing as far back as ancient Egypt. Crushed stone was used extensively by the first great road building civilizations, such as ancient Greece and ancient Rome.

See also 
 Automated mining
 Building material
 Dry stone
 Fair Stone standard
 Mining

References

External links
The state of the world stone industry, 2004, Stone World
Stone Industry Statistical Data (US)
World statistical data

Stone (material)
Mining
Industries (economics)